Muhafiz was directed by Syed Noor and produced by Sohail Butt. It starred Nadeem and Shahid in lead roles, accompanied by Saud, Saima Noor and Jana Malik.

References

1990s Urdu-language films
1998 films
Pakistani action films
Films directed by Syed Noor
Films scored by M Arshad

Urdu-language Pakistani films